Ali Omar Mohamed also known as Cali Xoor Xoor was a Berbera Port's longest serving manager.

See also

List of Somalis
Berbera Port

References

Living people
Year of birth missing (living people)
Issa Musa